
Divisadero may refer to:

Places

Mexico
 Divisadero, Chihuahua, a town on the Ferrocarril Chihuahua al Pacífico (Copper Canyon railroad)
 Divisaderos, Sonora

United States
 Divisadero Street, in San Francisco
 Divisadero Street, in Visalia, California

Other 
Divisadero (novel), a novel by Canadian author Michael Ondaatje
Divisadero Group, a group of geologic formation the Patagonian Andes